Harlin is a rural town and locality in the Somerset Region, Queensland, Australia.

Geography
Harlin is a small town in South East Queensland.

History
The town was named after Charlotte (née Harlin), wife of John Dunn Moore of the Colinton pastoral property. Their son William John Harlin Moore was a Member of the Queensland Legislative Assembly.

Harlin Post Office opened by September 1907 (a receiving office had been open from 1905) and closed in 1989.

Harlin Provisional School opened on 1908. On 1 January 1909, it became Harlin State School.

The town was marooned during the 2011 floods. Over 40 travellers were stranded by the dangerous and rising flood waters of the Brisbane River and the Ivory and Maronghi Creeks. They were housed by the publicans and owners of the Harlin Hotel and the Caltex service station from 9 January 2011, until the flooded creeks and rivers subsided.

On 1 February 2018, Harlin's postcode changed from 4306 to 4314.

Heritage listings 

Harlin has a number of heritage-listed sites, including:
 over Ivory (formerly Maronghi) Creek: Harlin Rail Bridge
 Sinnamons Lane: Yimbun Railway Tunnel

Education 

Harlin State School is a government primary (Prep-6) school for boys and girls at 8521 Brisbane Valley Highway. In 2017, the school had an enrolment of 65 students with 5 teachers (4 full-time equivalent) and 5 non-teaching staff (3 full-time equivalent). In 2018, the school had an enrolment of 58 students with 6 teachers (4 full-time equivalent) and 4 non-teaching staff (2 full-time equivalent).

There are no secondary schools in Harlin. The nearest government secondary schools are Toogoolawah State High School in Toogoolawah to the south, Kilcoy State High School in Kilcoy to the east, and Nanango State High School in Nanango to the north-west.

References

Further reading

External links

 

Towns in Queensland
Suburbs of Somerset Region
Localities in Queensland